The Staircase is a historical fiction novel by Ann Rinaldi.

Plot summary

Lizzy Ender's father dumps her at a Santa Fe convent after her mother died on the Santa Fe Trail. A Methodist, Lizzy is an outcast in the school who can't comprehend the dedication to Catholicism. She thinks the nuns who pray to Saint Joseph for help to finish their choir loft (which doesn't have a staircase) are crazy. She befriends an unemployed carpenter and suggests he build the staircase. Her classmates are furious as they were waiting for a miracle to occur. The carpenter, named Jose, proceeds to build the staircase in a matter of weeks armed with three simple tools and his faith. After building the staircase, Jose disappears and Lizzy decides to leave the convent to live with her father, who was currently living on a ranch in Texas.

This story is based on the real legend of the miracle occurring at the Loretto Chapel in Santa Fe, New Mexico, where an unnamed man (said to be Saint Joseph) built a staircase. The circular staircase made two complete revolutions lacking both nails and a center support.

A version of this story was done as the 1998 television movie The Staircase starring William Petersen (as Joad), Barbara Hershey (as Mother Madalyn), and Diane Ladd (as Sister Margaret).

Novels by Ann Rinaldi
Historical novels
2000 American novels